Streptomyces gancidicus is a bacterium species from the genus of Streptomyces. Streptomyces gancidicus produces cyclo(leucylpropyl) and the gancidin-complex.

See also 
 List of Streptomyces species

References

Further reading

External links
Type strain of Streptomyces gancidicus at BacDive -  the Bacterial Diversity Metadatabase

gancidicus
Bacteria described in 1957